Romans is a 2013 Indian Malayalam-language comedy thriller film directed by Boban Samuel. The film is produced by Arun Ghosh and Bijoy Chandran under the banner Chand V Creations. The film stars Kunchacko Boban, Biju Menon and Nivetha Thomas.
The core plots were inspired from 1989 American comedy film We're No Angels, directed by Neil Jordan.

The film released on 17 January 2013, and received positive responses from critics. The film was an all-time blockbuster at the box office.

Plot
Akash and Shibu are two convicted criminals. They are being transported to a jail with another convict via train. Shibu and the other convicts beat the cops traveling with them and Shibu jumps out of the train with Akash.

Meanwhile, not so far away is a village called Poomala, which is on the Kerala - Tamil Nadu border. Poomala is home to a famous century-old Latin Catholic church which had been closed for years. Thommichan is the only prominent and wealthy man in the village and is highly respected by the townsfolk. He attempts to get two priests to come and reopen their church. The men said that they could not come, but Thomichan mishears them saying that they will come. Thomichan starts preparations to welcome the priests.

Akash and Shibu reach Poomala. They end up reaching the church and they find themselves surrounded by the townsfolk. Soon, they realize that the people have mistaken them to be the priests. The men begin to masquerade as priests to avoid being captured. Akash becomes Fr. Paul and Shibu becomes Fr. Sebastian aka Sebu.

The men find luck on their side as their doings end up having positive effects and strengthening the belief of the townspeople. Shibu causes the old, unused church bell to fix itself while he was trying to steal it. Another example is when they are to cure the insanity of the mother of Mathukutty, a tailor. The crazed woman attacks them and unknowingly hits a socket and gets electrocuted, which cures her. But the event leaves Geevarghese, a preacher who does not like the new priests to unknowingly get electrocuted and become insane.

The men constantly hear the people saying that they 'Came even after knowing everything'. The duo have no idea what the people mean by that. They ask Achankunju, the sexton, about the matter and he tells them the truth.

A priest named Fr. Rodriguez was the priest of the church years ago. A girl fell in love with him and committed suicide after revealing her feelings to him. When the townsfolk heard the news, they went to question Fr. Rodriguez, who by then had killed himself. It is said that his ghost has been killing all the priests who come to the church on the Perunal or Holy Day.

Akash and Shibu are terrified and plan to escape. Akash realizes that he knows Thommichan's daughter Eleena and she knows who Akash is. Akash was a magician who was a friend of Eleena. He was arrested for cheating and robbery. She at first threatens to expose the men but later forgives them after knowing of their good deeds.

The men's attempts to flee end up failing as they circle back and end up back in Poomala. Finally, Shibu plans to steal some ornaments and escape. But Akash opposes him, leading to a fight. Shibu locks him in a room and runs away, but Achankunju frees Akash (initially believing that it was a ghost). Akash finds out that Shibu has not run away and they reconcile.

Later, on the Perunal, they perform the ritual where the priests are said to die. Akash says that Fr. Rodriguez is the cause of the curse and moves to destroy his gravestone. But just before he makes his move, he seemingly bleeds to death. When the townsfolk blame Fr. Paul, Sebu insults Fr. Rodriguez. This enrages Pappichayan, an elderly photographer who is highly respected. He shouts that the church should be destroyed and a new church in Fr. Rodriguez's name should be built.

Just then, the seemingly dead Fr. Paul gets up and reveals that he faked his death to reveal the truth to the townsfolk. He says that Pappichayan is the father of Fr. Rodriguez. He blames the town for killing his son and has been killing every priest who comes to the church. He poisons the Vayanayappam, a food which the priests eat during the ritual, thus making it look like a curse or a mysterious death. It is revealed that Shibu saw Pappichayan poisoning the Vayanayappam the night he tried to run away with the loot. This made him to return and reveal the facts to Akash. To avoid exposing Fr. Sebu, Fr. Paul lies that Fr. Sebu had a vision in which he saw the truth and the townsfolk blindly believe them (owing to the fact that the townsfolk believe the priests have mystical powers). Pappichayan is subsequently arrested.

Later in the church, the priests ask the townsfolk to close their eyes for prayer. When everyone is praying, the men escape. While running, Akash sees Eleena, who tells him to keep running. But they soon are caught by the police. The police inspector Vetrimaaran, who has been hunting the duo since their escape, tells the men that he knows what they did in Poomala and as a reward, their punishment will be reduced. Akash smiles and winks at Eleena, as the cops take him and Shibu away.

It is shown that the people of Poomala still have not learned the truth about the priests and think them to be god's angels. The end credit scenes shows two men in Santa Claus costumes celebrating Christmas with the elderly. The men are revealed to be Akash and Shibu, who have once again escaped from prison.

Cast

 Kunchacko Boban as Akash / Fr. Paul
 Biju Menon as Shibu / Fr. Sebastian also known as Fr. Sebu
 Nivetha Thomas as Eleena
 Lalu Alex as Thommichan
 TG Ravi as Pappichayan
 Vijayaraghavan as Fr. Gabriel
 Arun Ghosh as Fr. Rodriguez
 Akanksha Puri as Annie aka Annamma
 Nelson Sooranad as Geevarghese
 Kalabhavan Shaju as Mathukkutty
 Kochu Preman as Achankunju, the sexton
 Jaffar Idukki as Durai Raj
 Joice Nadakapadom as Joy
 Gayathri as Thommichan's wife
 Devu Krishnan as Reena 
 Shalu Kurien as Gracy
 Santhakumari as Pappi's wife
 Swati Verma as Kathreena
 Jayan Cherthala as Police Sub-inspector Eanashu
 Thomas Unniyadan as the MLA (Cameo)
 Geetha Salam as Aravindan, the oracle
 Kalabhavan Haneef as Andrews, lottery salesman
 Shivaji Guruvayoor as Bishop Idachal
 Lishoy as Akash's father
 Kakka Ravi as C.I. Vetrimaran
 Ponnamma Babu as Mathukutty's mother
 Joy Pallassery as Jose
 Sreekala Thaha as Jose's wife
 Sreelakshmi as Jose's daughter
 Vimal Raj
 Venu Machad

Release
Romans released on 17 January 2013 in 74 cinemas across Kerala, receiving positive response from critics. The film was a notable commercial success at the box office and ran for over 100 days in theatres. Satyam Audios released the Blu-ray, DVD and VCD of Romans on 20 May 2013.

Critical reception
Some critics noted that the plot was similar to the 1989 Neil Jordan film We're No Angels.

Smitha of One India gave the movie 3.5/5 stars, stating that "Romans is a comic caper and you will have plenty of reasons to laugh your heart out!"

IndiaGlitz gave the movie 6.5/10 stars, concluding that "Romans is targeted at the massive number of spectators who relish zany capers. If you are a member of this group, it's double the fun and guffaws this time; almost sure in leading to another commercial hit."

Box office
The film was commercial success. The film was made at a budget of 4.5 crore, including print and publicity cost.  The film ran for over 125 days in theatres and grossed a total of over ₹15 crore from the Kerala box office.

Soundtrack

References

2013 films
2010s Malayalam-language films
2010s comedy thriller films
Indian comedy thriller films
Indian remakes of American films
2013 comedy films
Films scored by M. Jayachandran
Films about Catholicism
Films about Christianity
Catholic Church in India
Films directed by Boban Samuel